Dichrostigma flavipes is a species of snakefly in the family Raphidiidae. It is found in Western Europe.

References

Raphidioptera
Insects described in 1863